The Brazil national access team, also known as Seleacesso, was a Brazilian football team formed in 1962 and 1964 especially for the South American Access Championship, a tournament between national teams from South America that were formed only by athletes who did not disputed their national top league level.

In Brazil, players who competed in their state level leagues were accepted.

Titles
South American Access Championship
Winners (2): 1962, 1964

All matches played 

Overall 9 matches, 5 wins, 3 draws, 0 loses, 17 goals scored, 8 goals awarded (+9 difference)

Squads
The following players were called up to the Brazil in each tournament. In 1962 only players from the São Paulo countryside were called up. In 1964, only players from less important clubs in Rio de Janeiro league.

From 1962 team, Jurandir and Ademar participated in senior A team friendly matches in the same year. Jurandir was called to be part of the Brazil's squad of the 1962 FIFA World Cup.

1962
Head coach:  Sylvio Pirillo

1964
Head coach:  Denoni Alves

References

Brazil national football team